Brownfield High School is a public high school located in Brownfield, Texas (USA) and classified as a 3A school by the UIL.  It is part of the Brownfield Independent School District located in central Terry County.  In 2015, the school was rated "Met Standard" by the Texas Education Agency.

Academics

The City of Brownfield is served by the Brownfield Independent School District, ranked 899 out of 932 districts in Texas with a zero star rating.

Brownfield High School was rated "Academically Unacceptable" by the Texas State Board of Education in 2011.

For the 2012–2013 school year, Brownfield High School State of Texas Assessments of Academic Readiness test scores resulted in the following student passing scores:

-23% of students passed writing

-45% of students passed algebra

-67% of students passed biology

-54% of students passed chemistry

-48% of students passed reading

-19% of students passed geography

For the 2015-16 School Year, Brownfield High School was ranked among the bottom of all high schools in Texas, with a ranking of 1384 out of 1692 high schools.

Athletics
The Brownfield Cubs compete in these sports - 

Cross Country, Volleyball, Football, Basketball, Powerlifting, Golf, Tennis, Track, Baseball & Softball

State Titles
Girls Basketball - 
2021 (3A)
1988(3A)
Girls Cross Country - 
1998(3A)
 
Boys basketball
2016

State Finalists
Baseball - 
1964(3A), 1986(3A)

References

External links
Brownfield ISD

Schools in Terry County, Texas
Public high schools in Texas